Holmium titanate  is an inorganic compound with the chemical formula Ho2Ti2O7.

Holmium titanate is a spin ice material like dysprosium titanate and holmium stannate.

References 

Holmium compounds
Titanates
Inorganic compounds